The Pacific Scandal was a political scandal in Canada involving bribes being accepted by 150 members of the Conservative government in the attempts of private interests to influence the bidding for a national rail contract.  As part of British Columbia's 1871 agreement to join the Canadian Confederation, the government had agreed to build a transcontinental railway linking the Pacific Province to the eastern provinces.

The scandal led to the resignation of Canada's first Prime Minister, John A. Macdonald and a transfer of power from his Conservative government to a Liberal government, led by Alexander Mackenzie. One of the new government's first measures was to introduce secret ballots in an effort to improve the integrity of future elections. After the scandal broke, the railway plan collapsed, and the proposed line was not built. An entirely different operation later built the Canadian Pacific Railway to the Pacific.

Background 
For a young and loosely-defined nation, the building of a national railway was an active attempt at state-making, as well as an aggressive capitalist venture. Canada, a nascent country with a population of 3.5 million in 1871, lacked the means to exercise meaningful de facto control within the de jure political boundaries of the recently-acquired Rupert's Land, and building a transcontinental railway was a national policy of high order to change that situation. Moreover, after the American Civil War the American frontier rapidly expanded west with land-hungry settlers, exacerbating talk of annexation. Indeed, sentiments of Manifest Destiny were abuzz at the time: in 1867, the year of Confederation, US Secretary of State William H. Seward surmised that the whole North American continent "shall be, sooner or later, within the magic circle of the American Union." Therefore, preventing American investment into the project was considered as being in Canada's national interest. Thus the federal government favoured an "all Canadian route" through the rugged Canadian Shield of northern Ontario and refused to consider a less costly route passing south through Wisconsin and Minnesota.

However, a route across the Canadian Shield was highly unpopular with potential investors not only in the United States but also in Canada and especially in Great Britain, the only other viable sources of financing. For would-be investors, the objections were not primarily based on politics or nationalism but economics.  At the time, national governments lacked the finances needed to undertake such large projects. For the first transcontinental railroad, the United States government had made extensive grants of public land to the railway's builders, inducing private financiers to fund the railway on the understanding that they would acquire rich farmland along the route, which could then be sold for a large profit.  However, the eastern terminus of the proposed Canadian Pacific route, unlike that of the first transcontinental, was not in rich Nebraskan farmland, but deep within the Canadian Shield.  Copying the American financing model whilst insisting on an all-Canadian route would require the railway's backers to build hundreds of miles of track across rugged shield terrain, with little economic value. at considerable expense before they could expect to access lucrative farmland in Manitoba and the newly-created Northwest Territories, which at that time included Alberta and Saskatchewan.  Many financiers, who had expected to make a relatively quick profit, were not willing to make that sort of long-term commitment.

Nevertheless, the Montreal capitalist Hugh Allan, with his syndicate Canada Pacific Railway Company, sought the potentially lucrative charter for the project. The problem lay in that Allan and Macdonald highly and secretly were in cahoots with American financiers such as George W. McMullen and Jay Cooke, men who were deeply interested in the rival American undertaking, the Northern Pacific Railroad.

Scandal 
Two groups competed for the contract to build the railway, Hugh Allan's Canada Pacific Railway Company and David Lewis Macpherson's Inter-Oceanic Railway Company. On April 2, 1873, Lucius Seth Huntington, a Liberal Member of Parliament, created an uproar in the House of Commons. He announced he had uncovered evidence that Allan and his associates had been granted the Canadian Pacific Railway contract in return for political donations of $360,000.

In 1873, it became known that Allan had contributed a large sum of money to the Conservative government's re-election campaign of 1872; some sources quote a sum over $360,000. Allan had promised to keep American capital out of the railway deal but had lied to Macdonald over this vital point, as Macdonald later discovered. The Liberal Party, the opposition party in Parliament, accused the Conservatives of having made a tacit agreement to give the contract to Hugh Allan in exchange for money.

In making such allegations, the Liberals and their allies in the press (particularly George Brown's newspaper The Globe) presumed that most of the money had been used to bribe voters in the 1872 election. The secret ballot, which was then considered a novelty, had not yet been introduced in Canada. Although it was illegal to offer, solicit or accept bribes in exchange for votes, effective enforcement of the prohibition proved impossible.

Despite Macdonald's claims that he was innocent, evidence came to light showing receipts of money from Allan to Macdonald and some of his political colleagues. Perhaps even more damaging to Macdonald was when the Liberals discovered a telegram through a former employee of Allan; it which was thought to have been stolen from the safe of Allan's lawyer, John Abbott.

The scandal proved fatal to Macdonald's government. Macdonald's control of Parliament was already tenuous since the 1872 election. Since party discipline was not as strong as it is today, once Macdonald's culpability in the scandal became known, he could no longer expect to retain the confidence of the House of Commons.

Macdonald resigned as prime minister on 5 November 1873. He also offered his resignation as the head of the Conservative Party, but it was not accepted, and he was convinced to stay. Perhaps as a direct result of this scandal, the Conservatives fell in the eyes of the public and was relegated to being the Official Opposition in the federal election of 1874 in which secret ballots were used for the first time. It gave Alexander Mackenzie a firm mandate to succeed Macdonald as the new prime minister of Canada.

Despite the short-term defeat, the scandal was not a mortal wound to Macdonald, the Conservative Party, or the Canadian Pacific Railway. The Long Depression gripped Canada shortly after Macdonald left office, and although the causes of the depression were largely external to Canada, many Canadians blamed Mackenzie for the ensuing hard times. Macdonald returned as prime minister in the 1878 election thanks to his National Policy. He held the office of prime minister to his death in 1891, and the Canadian Pacific was completed by 1885, while Macdonald still in office.

References

Bibliography

Further reading

  downplays role of Americans
 
 
 
 

Primary sources

External links
Canada's first political scandal, CBC Video
Sauvé, Todd D. Manifest Destiny and Western Canada: Book One: Sitting Bull, the Little Bighorn and the North-West Mounted Police Revisited (an alternative view of the Pacific Scandal and the overall binational political context at the time)
Chapter I – A Tale of Two Countries
Chapter II – A Tale of Two Railroads

Political scandals in Canada
Canadian Pacific Railway
History of transport in Canada
Political funding
Political history of Canada